North Windham is a census-designated place (CDP) within the town of Windham in Cumberland County, Maine, United States. The population was 4,904 at the 2010 census. It is part of the Portland–South Portland–Biddeford, Maine Metropolitan Statistical Area.

Geography

Demographics

As of the census of 2000, there were 4,568 people, 1,773 households, and 1,297 families residing in the CDP. The racial makeup of the CDP was 98.14% White, 0.55% African American, 0.39% Native American, 0.28% Asian, 0.02% from other races, and 0.61% from two or more races. Hispanic or Latino of any race were 0.33% of the population.

There were 1,773 households, out of which 38.0% had children under the age of 18 living with them, 58.4% were married couples living together, 11.9% had a female householder with no husband present, and 26.8% were non-families. 21.0% of all households were made up of individuals, and 8.1% had someone living alone who was 65 years of age or older. The average household size was 2.57 and the average family size was 2.97.

In the CDP, the age distribution of the population shows 26.7% under the age of 18, 6.1% from 18 to 24, 31.8% from 25 to 44, 25.2% from 45 to 64, and 10.2% who were 65 years of age or older. The median age was 36 years. For every 100 females, there were 89.2 males. For every 100 females age 18 and over, there were 87.3 males.

The median income for a household in the CDP was $44,395, and the median income for a family was $51,111. Males had a median income of $32,417 versus $25,635 for females. The per capita income for the CDP was $19,566. About 4.4% of families and 5.4% of the population were below the poverty line, including 6.9% of those under age 18 and 9.8% of those age 65 or over.

Camp
Center Day Camp, a day camp run by the Jewish Community Alliance of Southern Maine, is located in North Windham.

Notable people 

 Willard Mains, pitcher for the Chicago White Stockings, Cincinnati Kelly's Killers, Milwaukee Brewers, and Boston Beaneaters; born in North Windham

References

Census-designated places in Maine
Portland metropolitan area, Maine
Census-designated places in Cumberland County, Maine